Arakhley is a rural locality (a selo) in Chitinsky District of Zabaykalsky Krai, located on the southwest bank of Arakhley Lake,  from Chita.  Population: 306 (2002).

There are many tourist attractions nearby.  A monument to the residents of Arakhley who died in Great Patriotic War is located in the village.

References
 The Encyclopedia of Trans-Baykal.  Entry on Arakhley 

Rural localities in Zabaykalsky Krai